Lisdoo is a townland on the R132 road near Dundalk in County Louth, Ireland. The townland is in the civil parish of Dundalk.

The Castletown River separates the townland from Dundalk town. The R177 road connects the town to the Northern Ireland border.

References 

Townlands of County Louth